Péter Varga (born 24 January 1974) is a former Hungarian heavyweight kickboxer.

Titles and accomplishments
 2003 King Of The Ring Europe Grand Prix champion
 2002 K-1 World Grand Prix Preliminary Italy runner up
 2002 WPKC Muay Thai Super Heavyweight World Champion +95 kg
 W.P.K.L. Kickboxing European champion
 A.K.B.O. Kickboxing European champion
 1999 IKBO European Kickboxing champion
 1999 Kung Fu World champion

Kickboxing record 

|-
|-  bgcolor="#FFBBBB"
| 2007-02-24 || Loss ||align=left| Freddy Kemayo || K-1 European League 2007 Hungary || Budapest, Hungary || KO || 3 || 2:16
|-
|-  style="background:#cfc;"
| 2007-01-26 || Win ||align=left| Adis Šabotić ||  || Rijeka, Croatia || KO (Liver shot) || 2 || 
|-
|-  bgcolor="#FFBBBB"
| 2006-08-18 || Loss ||align=left| Zabit Samedov || K-1 Hungary 2006 Quarter Finals || Debrecen, Hungary || Decision (Unanimous) || 3 || 3:00
|-
|-  bgcolor="#FFBBBB"
| 2006-07-08 || Loss ||align=left| Yussuf Belmikdan || WPKC & WMC Grand Prix Tournament, Quarter Finals || Riccione, Italy || TKO (Doctor Stop.) ||  || 
|-  bgcolor="#FFBBBB"
| 2006-02-17 || Loss ||align=left| Mindaugas Sakalauskas || K-1 European League 2006 in Budapest || Budapest, Hungary || Decision || 3 || 3:00
|-
|-  bgcolor="#FFBBBB"
| 2005-11-12 || Loss ||align=left| Ciprian Sora || Local Combat 17  || Braşov, Romania || Decision || 3 || 3:00
|-
|-  bgcolor="#FFBBBB"
| 2005-08-19 || Loss ||align=left| Pavel Majer || K-1 Hungary Grand Prix 2005 || Debrecen, Hungary || Ext.R Decision || 4 || 3:00
|-
|-  bgcolor="#FFBBBB"
| 2005-05-21 || Loss ||align=left| Wisam Feyli || K-1 Scandinavia Grand Prix 2005 Quarter Finals || Stockholm, Sweden || Decision (Split) || 3 || 3:00
|-
|-  bgcolor="#CCFFCC"
| 2005-04-03 || Win ||align=left| Hasan Gül || Fight Gala, Sportcentrum Schuttersveld ||Rotterdam, Netherlands || TKO (Doctor stoppage) || ||
|-  
| 2004-11-05 ||  ||align=left| Marco van Spaendonck || Total Kombat 1 "Cade Braşovul" || Braşov, Romania ||  ||  || 
|-
|-  bgcolor="#FFBBBB"
| 2004-08-19 || Loss ||align=left| Grégory Tony || K-1 Grand Prix Hungary || Debrecen, Hungary || Decision || 3 || 3:00
|-
|-  bgcolor="#FFBBBB"
| 2004 || Loss ||align=left| Josip Bodrožić ||  || Ugento, Italy || Decision (Unanimous) || 5 || 3:00	
|-	
! style=background:white colspan=9 |	
|- 
|-  bgcolor="#CCFFCC"
| 2003-11-29 || Win ||align=left| Jerrel Venetiaan || King Of The Ring 2003 Europe Grand Prix, Final || Padova, Italy || 2nd Ext.R Decision (Split) || 5 || 3:00
|-
! style=background:white colspan=9 |
|-
|-  bgcolor="#CCFFCC"
| 2003-11-29 || Win ||align=left| Jan Muller || King Of The Ring 2003 Europe Grand Prix, Semi Finals || Padova, Italy || TKO (Referee Stoppage/2 Knockdowns) || 1 || 
|-
! style=background:white colspan=9 |	
|- 
|-  bgcolor="#FFBBBB"
| 2003-05-10 || Loss ||align=left| Evgeny Orlov || K-1 World Grand Prix 2003 Preliminary Milan Semi Finals || Milan, Italy || KO || 1 || 1:15
|-
|-  bgcolor="#CCFFCC"
| 2003-05-10 || Win ||align=left| Dan Jarling || K-1 World Grand Prix 2003 Preliminary Milan Quarter Finals || Milan, Italy || Ext.R Decision || 4 || 3:00
|-
|-  bgcolor="#CCFFCC"
| 2002-11-30 || Win ||align=left| Azem Maksutaj || Kickboxing Mondiale 3  || Padova, Italy || KO || 4 || 
|-
! style=background:white colspan=9 |
|- 
|-  bgcolor="#FFBBBB"
| 2002 || Loss ||align=left| Ante Varnica  ||  ||  || KO || 1 ||
|-
|-  bgcolor="#FFBBBB"
| 2002-04-20 || Loss ||align=left| Petr Vondracek || K-1 World Grand Prix 2002 Preliminary Italy Final || Milan, Italy || KO || 2 || 2:45 
|-
! style=background:white colspan=9 |
|-
|-  bgcolor="#CCFFCC"
| 2002-04-20 || Win ||align=left| Danilo Capuzi || K-1 World Grand Prix 2002 Preliminary Italy Semi Finals || Milan, Italy || KO || 2 || 1:51
|-
|-  bgcolor="#CCFFCC"
| 2002-04-20 || Win ||align=left| Mario Katzis || K-1 World Grand Prix 2002 Preliminary Italy Quarter Finals || Milan, Italy || KO || 3 || 0:41 
|-
|-  bgcolor="#FFBBBB"
| 2001-11-18 || Loss ||align=left| Matt Skelton || Jungle Wars V || Northampton, England, UK || TKO (Doctor Stoppage, Knee Injury) || 3 || 0:53 
|-
! style=background:white colspan=9 |
|-
|-  bgcolor="#CCFFCC"
| 2001-09-23 || Win ||align=left| Dimitri Alexudis || Battle Of Arnhem III || Arnhem, Netherlands || KO || 8 || 
|-
|-  bgcolor="#FFBBBB"
| 2001-03-17 || Loss ||align=left| Nicholas Pettas || K-1 Gladiators 2001 || Yokohama, Japan || KO (Right Low Kick) || 3 || 1:39 
|-
|-  bgcolor="#FFBBBB"
| 2001-02-04 || Loss ||align=left| Jörgen Kruth || K-1 Holland GP 2001 in Arnhem Quarter Finals || Arnhem, Netherlands || KO || 2 || 
|-
|-  bgcolor="#FFBBBB"
| 2000-12-12 || Loss ||align=left| Remy Bonjasky || It's Showtime - Christmas Edition || Haarlem, Netherlands || KO (Jumping Knee Strike) || 1 || 2:57
|-
|-  bgcolor="#FFBBBB"
| 2000-05-12 || Loss ||align=left| Paris Vasilikos || K-1 King of the Ring 2000 Quarter Finals || Milan, Italy || Decision (Unanimous) || 3 || 3:00
|-
|-
| colspan=9 | Legend:

See also
List of K-1 events
List of K-1 champions
List of male kickboxers

External links 
 K-1 profile

References 

1967 births
Hungarian male kickboxers
Heavyweight kickboxers
Hungarian male judoka
Hungarian male karateka
Living people
20th-century Hungarian people
21st-century Hungarian people